The 2021 Louisiana Ragin' Cajuns softball team represented the University of Louisiana at Lafayette during the 2021 NCAA Division I softball season. The Ragin' Cajuns played their home games at Yvette Girouard Field at Lamson Park and were led by fourth-year head coach Gerry Glasco. They were members of the Sun Belt Conference.

Previous season
On March 12, 2020, the Sun Belt Conference announced the indefinite suspension of all spring athletics, including softball, due to the increasing risk of the COVID-19 pandemic. On March 16, the Sun Belt formally announced the cancelation of all spring sports, thus ending their season definitely.

The Cajuns finished the abbreviated season 1st in the only-released RPI in the NCAA, thus making them the claimed "RPI National Champions".

Preseason

Sun Belt Conference Coaches Poll
The Sun Belt Conference Coaches Poll was released on February 8, 2021. Louisiana was picked to finish first in the Sun Belt Conference with 100 votes and 10 first place votes, all first place votes available, for the second year in a row.

Preseason All-Sun Belt team
Summer Ellyson (LA, SR, Pitcher)
Leanna Johnson (TROY, SO, Pitcher)
Alissa Dalton (LA, SR, Shortstop/3rd Base)
Katie Webb (TROY, SR, Infielder/1st Base)
Raina O'Neal (LA, JR, Outfielder)
Julie Raws (LA, SR, Catcher)
Courney Dean (CCU, SR, Outfielder)
Mekhia Freeman (GASO, SR, Outfielder)
Korie Kreps (ULM, JR, Outfielder)'
Kaitlyn Alderink (LA, SR, 2nd Base)
Jade Gortarez (LA, SR, Shortstop/3rd Base)
Ciara Bryan (LA, SR, Outfielder)
Kelly Horne (TROY, SO, Infielder/2nd Base)
Makiya Thomas (CCU, SR, Outfielder/Infielder)
Tara Oltmann (TXST, SR, Infielder/Shortstop)
Jayden Mount (ULM, SR, Infielder)
Katie Lively (TROY, SO, Outfielder)

Sun Belt Conference Preseason Player of the Year
Alissa Dalton (LA, SR, Shortstop/3rd Base)

Sun Belt Conference Preseason Pitcher of the Year
Summer Ellyson (LA, SR, Pitcher)

National Softball Signing Day

Roster

Coaching staff

Schedule and results

Schedule Source:
*Rankings are based on the team's current ranking in the NFCA/USA Softball poll.

Baton Rouge Regional

Posteason

Conference Accolades 
Player of the Year: Ciara Bryan – LA
Pitcher of the Year: Summer Ellyson – LA
Freshman of the Year: Sara Vanderford – TXST
Newcomer of the Year: Ciara Bryan – LA
Coach of the Year: Gerry Glasco – LA

All Conference First Team
Ciara Bryan (LA)
Summer Ellyson (LA)
Sara Vanderford (TXST)
Leanna Johnson (TROY)
Jessica Mullins (TXST)
Olivia Lackie (USA)
Kj Murphy (UTA)
Katie Webb (TROY)
Jayden Mount (ULM)
Kandra Lamb (LA)
Kendall Talley (LA)
Meredith Keel (USA)
Tara Oltmann (TXST)
Jade Sinness (TROY)
Katie Lively (TROY)

All Conference Second Team
Kelly Horne (TROY)
Meagan King (TXST)
Mackenzie Brasher (USA)
Bailee Wilson (GASO)
Makiya Thomas (CCU)
Kaitlyn Alderink (LA)
Abby Krzywiecki (USA)
Kenzie Longanecker (APP)
Alissa Dalton (LA)
Julie Rawls (LA)
Korie Kreps (ULM)
Kayla Rosado (CCU)
Justice Milz (LA)
Gabby Buruato (APP)
Arieann Bell (TXST)

References:

Rankings

References

Louisiana
Louisiana Ragin' Cajuns softball
Louisiana Ragin' Cajuns softball seasons
Louisiana